Ismail Marzuki (also known as Bang Ma'ing; 11 May 1914 – 25 May 1958) was an Indonesian composer, songwriter and musician who wrote around 202 to 240 songs between 1931 and 1958, including numerous popular patriotic songs. Among his best-known works are "Halo, Halo Bandung", "Gugur Bunga", and "Rayuan Pulau Kelapa". In 1968, he was honoured with the creation of the well-known Taman Ismail Marzuki (the Ismail Marzuki Park, often called TIM) which is a cultural centre in Menteng in central Jakarta. In 2004 he was declared one of the National Heroes of Indonesia.

Biography
Marzuki was born in Kwitang, Jakarta (formerly known as Batavia) to a wealthy Betawi family. His father Marzuki owned an automobile repair shop, and played the rebana; his mother died while giving birth to him. From a young age Marzuki enjoyed music, listening to songs repeatedly on the family's gramophone and learning to play the rebana, ukulele, and guitar.

Marzuki studied at an elementary school for Native Indonesians, the HIS (Hollandsch Inlandsche School) in Menteng; he later attended the Dutch-language middle school MULO (Meer Uitgebreid Lager Onderwijs) on Mendjangan Street (now Kwini I Street) in Jakarta. He became fluent in Indonesian, English, and Dutch. He also studied religion at Unwanul Wustha Madrasah. However, he did not study music formally, instead learning by himself.

In 1931, he wrote his first song, "O Sarinah", which was about a suffering people. During his career he wrote between 202 and 204 songs. Among his most famous compositions are "Halo, Halo Bandung, "Rayuan Pulau Kelapa" (1944, Solace on Coconut Island), "Gugur Bunga di Taman Bakti" (1945, The Fallen Flower in Bakti Garden), and "Selendang Sutera" (1946, A Coil of Silk).

Marzuki started his music career by joining the Lief Java Orchestra by the mid 1930s. During this time he performed regularly with the group at Studio Orkes NIROM II in Tegalega, Bandung, as part of the NIROM (Nederlandsch-Indische Radio-omroepmaatschappij) station's Eastern Programme. Sometime around 1937 the group left NIROM and joined the rival station VORO (Vereeniging voor Oostersche Radio Omroep), playing live every Saturday. Afterwards he led the Jakarta Studio Orchestra, the Bandung Studio Orchestra, and later the Hoso Kanri Kyoku orchestra during Japanese occupation of Indonesia.

In 1957 he wrote his last song, "Inikah Bahagia" (Is This Happiness). He died at 14:00 on 25 May 1958 in his house in Tanah Abang, Jakarta. He is buried in Karet Bivak Cemetery.

Style
Marzuki's anthems are full of patriotism and love for Indonesia, with a spirit of unity and harmony. They are easy to remember, with simple lyrics and melodies. The scales are generally mid-range, making the songs easier to sing.

Personal life
Marzuki married Eulis Zuraidah, a Sundanese keroncong singer and orchestra member from Bandung, in 1940. His wife became the inspiration of his Sundanese song "Panon Hideung", which is the Sundanese version of Dark Eyes. He re-arranged the song in new lyrics but with the same title in Sundanese ("Panon Hideung" literally means "Black Eyes").

Marzuki enjoyed collecting musical instruments. His collection included guitars, mandolins, flutes, clarinets, saxophones, accordions, and a piano.

He was known for being fiercely nationalistic, once selling gado-gado with his wife instead of cooperating with the Dutch-Allied NICA (Nederlandsch-Indische Civiele Administratie) during the Indonesian National Revolution. However, he also had a romantic side, writing songs like "Kalau Anggrek Berbunga" (c. 1942–1945, When the Orchid Blossoms), "Jauh di Mata Di Hati Jangan" (1947), Far from the Eyes (But Not the Heart) and "Siasat Asmara" (1948, Love's Tactics).

Legacy

Marzuki has been described as "having good instincts for music", as well as a "genius" and "legendary". Besides as a piano, saxophone, guitar, accordion, and harmonium player, he was also well known as a singer with a heavy and deep baritone voice which some of his friends gave him nickname "Bing Crosby from Kwitang".

A large number of Marzuki's songs have been rerecorded and released in different genres, including pop music and keroncong, such as "Kr. Pasar Gambir dan Stambul Anak Jampang" (Kroncong of Gambir Market and Stambul of the Cowlicked Child) which was covered by Chrisye on the album Dekade with arrangement by Erwin Gutawa. Several of his songs, including "Halo, Halo Bandung", "Gugur Bunga", "Melati di Tapal Batas", "Selendang Sutra", "Pahlawan Muda", and "Rayuan Pulau Kelapa", are considered compulsory and taught in schools.

Classical composer Ananda Sukarlan has made virtuoso music for piano and/or orchestra based on his songs such as Selendang Sutra, Indonesia Pusaka and Rayuan Pulau Kelapa.

On 16 August 1961 Marzuki received the first Wijaya Kusuma award from President Sukarno. He was honoured posthumously in 1968 with the opening of Taman Ismail Marzuki, a cultural centre and park in central Jakarta. He was recognized as a National Hero of Indonesia in November 2004 by declaration of President Susilo Bambang Yudhoyono.

List of composed songs 
 Aryati
 Bandaneira
 Bandung Selatan di Waktu Malam (1948)
 Beta dan Ayunda
 Gagah Perwira (1944)
 Gita Malam
 Gugur Bunga
 Halo Halo Bandung
 Indonesia Pusaka (1940)
 Inikah Bahagia
 Jangan Ditanya
 Jauh di Mata Di Hati Jangan
 Juwita Malam
 Kalau Anggrek Berbunga
 Karangan Bunga dari Selatan
 Kasim Baba
 Kasih Putus di Tengah Jalan
 Keroncong Serenata
 Lenggang Bandung
 Melati di Tapal Batas (1947)
 O Angin Sampaikan Salamku
 O Kopral Jono
 O Sarinah (1931)
 Panon Hideung (1931)
 Patah Cincin
 Rayuan Pulau Kelapa
 Rindu Lukisan
 Roselani
 Sabda Alam
 Sampul Surat (1943)
 Saputangan dari Bandung Selatan
 Sejuta Bintang
 Selamat Datang Pahlawan Muda (1949)
 Selendang Sutra
 Sepasang Mata Bola (1946)
 Setangkai Bunga Mawar (1943)
 Siasat Asmara
 Sumbangsihku (1946)
 Wanita
 Ibu Pertiwi

References

External links 
  "Komponis" Bio Ismail Marzuki on Ensiklopedi Tokoh Indonesia

Bibliography
 
 
 

1914 births
1958 deaths
20th-century composers
Betawi people
Indonesian composers
National Heroes of Indonesia
People from Batavia, Dutch East Indies
People from Jakarta